Calfosch (Ladin: Calfosch) is a mountain village in South Tyrol, northern Italy. It is the highest village with permanent residents in the Val Badia at  AMSL, and a frazione of the comune (municipality) of Corvara.

External links

Frazioni of South Tyrol